Sergio Gadea
  Roberto Gallina
  Wayne Gardner
  Juan Garriga 
  Alex George
  Ezio Gianola
  Sete Gibernau
  Sébastien Gimbert
  Anthony Gobert
  Peter Goddard
  Jurgen van den Goorbergh
  Rodney Gould
  Leslie Graham
  Stuart Graham
  Alessandro Gramigni
  Bo Granath
  Mick Grant
  Silvio Grassetti
  Simone Grotzkij
  Hervé Guilleux
  Sylvain Guintoli

 G